Galiximab is a monoclonal antibody designed for the treatment of B-cell lymphoma. , it is undergoing Phase III clinical trials. The drug is a chimeric antibody from Macaca irus and Homo sapiens.

References

External links
 Official website

Monoclonal antibodies